Cuivre Township, Missouri may refer to the following townships in the State of Missouri:

Cuivre Township, Audrain County, Missouri
Cuivre Township, Pike County, Missouri

Missouri township disambiguation pages